Daniel Arturo Corcuera Osores (September 30, 1935 – August 21, 2017) was a Peruvian poet. Notable works include 
Noé delirante (1963), Primavera triunfante (1964), Las sirenas y las estaciones (1976), Los Amantes (1978) and Puente de los Suspiros (1982).

In 1972 he represented Peru in "La Bienal de Poesía de Knokke" in Belgium.

Selected works 
Cantoral (1953)
El grito del hombre (1957)
Sombra del jardín (1961)
Noé delirante (1963)
Primavera triunfante (1964)
Las sirenas y las estaciones (1976)
Los Amantes (1978) 
Puente de los Suspiros (1982).

References

External links
Biography and poetry

1935 births
2017 deaths
National University of San Marcos alumni
People from Trujillo (state)
Peruvian male poets
20th-century Peruvian poets
20th-century male writers